Dan Wayne Brown (December 22, 1950 – May 11, 2021) was an American politician who served as a member of the Missouri Senate, representing the 16th district from 2011 to 2019. He also served in the Missouri House of Representatives from 2008 to 2010, representing the 149th district.

Personal history
Dan Brown was born in Solo, Missouri, and was a graduate of Houston High School in Houston, Missouri. Brown received a Bachelor of Science degree in Agriculture and a Doctorate of Veterinary medicine from the University of Missouri. He was a practicing veterinarian for over 33 years and continued his practice in addition to his legislative duties. He died at the age of 70 on May 11, 2021.

Political history
Dan Brown first entered statewide politics in 2008 when he defeated Democrat Wayne Bledsoe and Constitution Party candidate Dennis E. Husted to win the District 149 seat.

After only one term in the House, Brown chose to run for State Senator in 2010, defeating incumbent Democrat Frank Barnitz to win the 16th district seat.

During the 96th General Assembly Senator Brown served on the following committees:
 Agriculture, Food Production, & Outdoor Resources.
 Appropriations.
 Education.
 Vice-chairman, Veterans Affairs, Emerging Issues, Pensions & Urban Affairs.

Organizations
Senator Brown belonged to the following groups:
 Member, American Veterinary Medical Association.
 Member, Missouri Veterinary Medical Association.
 Missouri Farm Bureau.
 Missouri Farmers Association (MFA).
 Charter member, Paseo Biofuel.
 Charter member, Mid-Missouri Energy.
 Member, National Rifle Association.
 Member, Missouri Republican Party.

References

University of Missouri alumni
Republican Party Missouri state senators
1950 births
American veterinarians
Male veterinarians
2021 deaths
21st-century American politicians
People from Texas County, Missouri